TYF may refer to:

Ten Yard Fight
Tribal Youth Federation (A left wing youth organisation in Tripura)
Turkish Sailing Federation (Türkiye Yelken Federasyonu)
Turkish Swimming Federation (Türkiye Yüzme Federasyonu)